The 1884–1885 season was 7th season of West Bromwich Albion Football Club. It was their third and final season at the Four Acres and their last season as an amateur club. Continuing the trial of various coloured kits during the club's early years, the players wore cardinal red and blue halved shirts. The club reached the FA Cup quarter-final for the first time, played in the semi-finals of the Staffordshire Senior Cup and Birmingham Charity Cup and were eliminated from the Birmingham Senior Cup at the third round stage.

FA Cup

Albion's second season in the FA Cup began with a first round match away at Junction Street School, Derby. The 7–1 victory was Albion's first ever win in the competition, with Jem Bayliss scoring the club's first FA Cup goal. In round two, Wednesbury Old Athletic were defeated by a 4–2 scoreline. Aston Villa provided the opposition in the third round; after a goalless draw in the initial match, Albion won the replay 3–0 in "drenching rain".

In the fourth round, Albion faced Welsh side, Druids, who did not take to the field by the time the match was due to start. Peter Morris records that the Welshmen refused to start the match until one of their late-arriving players turned up, while according to G. A. Willmore, the entire Druids team was late to arrive. Either way, Albion scored unopposed straight from the kick-off, after which the Druids players did take to the field. Albion scored again, through Arthur Loach, but the earlier goal was not counted and the score was recorded as 1–0.

Albion were then given a bye to the sixth round, the first time that they had reached this stage of the competition. They lost 0–2 to eventual FA Cup winners Blackburn Rovers in front of 16,393 spectators, the highest ever attendance at the Four Acres.

Source for match details:

Birmingham Senior Cup
Participating in their fourth Birmingham Senior Cup campaign, Albion faced Darlaston All Saints in the first round. Harry Aston scored a hat-trick in an 8–0 victory. In the second round, Jem Bayliss scored six goals in the team's 15–0 win against Bloxwich Strollers. Albion were eliminated in round three, losing 2–3 to St George's.

Source for match details:

Staffordshire Senior Cup
Albion, taking part in the Staffordshire Senior Cup for the third time, beat Burton Swifts 7–1 in the first round. In round two, a hat-trick from Arthur Loach contributed to an 8–0 win against Leek. Another hat-trick in the third round, this time from Jem Bayliss, saw Albion beat Stoke 6–2. Despite having scored 21 goals in the first three rounds, Albion failed to find the net in the semi-final, losing 0–2 to Walsall Town at Stoke's Victoria Ground.

Source for match details:

Birmingham Charity Cup

In the Birmingham Charity Cup semi-final, Albion were defeated 1–4 by Aston Villa. This was the second season in succession that Villa had beaten Albion in the competition, and by the same scoreline.

Source for match details:

Friendlies and benefit matches

As league football had yet to be established, West Bromwich Albion played in a number of friendly matches throughout the season. On 6 April 1885, Albion played their last game at the Four Acres, ahead of their move to Stoney Lane the following season. They beat Wednesbury Old Athletic 3–2, in front of 3,500 spectators.

Source for match details:

See also
1884–85 in English football

Footnotes

References 
Citations

Sources

West Bromwich Albion F.C. seasons
West Bromwich Albion